Chengxiang may refer to:

Grand chancellor (China), the highest-ranking executive official in imperial Chinese governments
Chengxiang District, a district in Putian, Fujian, China